CineLibri (Bulgarian: Синелибри) is an annual international book and movie festival in Bulgaria founded in 2015, intended to showcase the best literary adaptations for cinema, both contemporary and classic.  Jacqueline Wagenstein, one of the directors of Colibri Publishers, founded the event.

Programme 
The opening ceremony and award ceremony traditionally held in Hall 1 of National Palace of Culture in Sofia. CineLibri encompasses official selection of competing films or main program, which consists of literary adaptations for the big screen released during the last year or two. The Parallel Program consists of several sections: film classics and retrospectives; contemporary European film productions and co-productions; film panoramas and tributes to prominent directors and screenwriters; milestone documentaries and short films, various accompanying events, e.g. book premieres and discussions, educational lectures, masterclasses and workshops with the special guests of the festival.

Prize-winners are announced by an international jury, composed of famous producers, directors, art directors, screenwriters, actors and film composers who distinguish the best feature films in competition. The CineLibri statuette symbolizes the interaction between literature and cinema, and is handed for masterful literary adaptation to the relevant film directors and producers, for their skillful interpretation of a literary work by means of expression of cinema.

History 
The festival started in 2015, and was held in Sofia, Plovdiv and Varna in its first year. Among the honorary guests were the writer Margaret Mazzantini and the director and actor Sergio Castellitto.

In 2016, five more cities joined the event, and the CineLibri Prize went to French literary critic Frédéric Beigbeder.

In 2017 the festival was held in Sofia and 10 other cities.  For the first time, a winner was announced out of a film competition list.  The winner was nominated by an independent international jury consisting of Bruno Coulais, Keira Chaplin, Doriana Leondeff and Ilian Djevelekov. Rosso Istanbul directed by Ferzan Özpetek won the award for best film adaptation.  The Award for Entire Contribution went to the European director Volker Schlöndorff, who presented in Sofia his latest film, Return to Montauk.

Among the guests of the festival in 2017 was David Grossman, whose novel A Horse Walks into a Bar won the 2017 Man Booker International Prize.

In 2018 an international jury including Herman Koch, David Foenkinos, Michael McKell, Andy Deliana and Martichka Bozhilova in her capacity of president, bestowed the CineLibri award for best adaptation of the year on the film See You Up There (Au revoir là-haut) directed by Albert Dupontel. The honorary Cinelibri Award for Entire Contribution went to the British novelist and screenwriter Ian McEwan, who presented the film On Chesil Beach directed by Dominic Cooke.  McEwan, who was also awarded the honorary title "Doctor Honoris Causa" of Sofia University "St. Kliment Ohridski", delivered an academic speech on "Freedom of Expression".

In 2019, Christopher Lambert, in his capacity of jury’s president, bestowed the grand prize for the best literary adaptation upon the cinematic masterpiece of South Korea and Japan Burning (2018) adapted from the short story Burning Barn by the Japanese author Haruki Murakami. David Lagercrantz, Radu Mihaileanu, Loredana Cannata and Irini Jambonas were the other jury members.

CineLibri Best Literary Adaptation Award 2020 was bestowed on the film Berlin Alexanderplatz (2020), co-production of Germany, Netherlands, France and Canada, adapted from the eponymous novel by Alfred Döblin. The legendary film director and screenwriter Jean-Jacques Annaud was an honorable chairman of the jury presented by Mika Kaurismäki, Santiago Amigorena, Babis Makridis, Snezhina Petrova and Milko Lazarov.

References 

16. Grand Opening of CineLibri 2019 in Sofia
17. FNE at CineLibri IFF 2019 in Sofia: Interview with Founder and CEO Jacqueline Wagenstein
18. CineLibri IFF 2019 Winners Announced

External links 
 Official website

Film festivals in Bulgaria